Briar Ridge is a gated, upscale residential community partly in Dyer and partly in Schererville, in Lake County, Indiana. The neighborhood has a golf course, a community pool, and a dining hall.

Overview
Bordered on the south by 213th St, on the north by Main St, and on the west by Hart Ditch in a gated golf course neighborhood. Streets in Briar Ridge include: Ballybunion Ct, Inverness Ct, Killarney Dr, La Forestiere Ct, Portmarnock Ct, Royal Dublin Ln, Waterville Ct, La Hinch Ct, Tryall Ln, Perthshire Ln, Muirfield Dr, Rescobie Dr, Troon Ct, Turnberry Dr, St. Andrews Dr, Wilderness Dr, Augusta Way, Clubhouse Dr, Prestwick Dr, Inverness Ln, Carnoustie Ln, and Glen Eagles Drive. All but one of the  streets in the community are named after renowned world-class golf courses.

External links
 Briar Ridge Country Club

Gated communities in Indiana
Geography of Lake County, Indiana